The 2015 UEFA Women's Under-19 Championship qualifying competition was a women's under-19 football competition played in 2014 and 2015 to determine the seven teams joining Israel, who qualified automatically as hosts, in the 2015 UEFA Women's Under-19 Championship final tournament. A total of 47 UEFA member national teams entered the qualifying competition.

The final tournament also acted as the UEFA qualifier for the 2016 FIFA U-20 Women's World Cup in Papua New Guinea, with the four semi-finalists qualifying.

Format
The qualifying competition consisted of two rounds:
Qualifying round: Apart from Germany, England and France, which received byes to the elite round as the three teams with the highest seeding coefficient, the remaining 44 teams were drawn into 11 groups of four teams. Each group was played in single round-robin format at one of the teams selected as hosts after the draw. The 11 group winners and the 10 runners-up with the best record against the first and third-placed teams in their group advanced to the elite round.
Elite round: The 24 teams were drawn into six groups of four teams. Each group was played in single round-robin format at one of the teams selected as hosts after the draw. The six group winners and the runner-up with the best record against the first and third-placed teams in their group qualified for the final tournament.

Tiebreakers
If two or more teams were equal on points on completion of a mini-tournament, the following tie-breaking criteria were applied, in the order given, to determine the rankings:
 Higher number of points obtained in the mini-tournament matches played among the teams in question;
 Superior goal difference resulting from the mini-tournament matches played among the teams in question;
 Higher number of goals scored in the mini-tournament matches played among the teams in question;
 If, after having applied criteria 1 to 3, teams still had an equal ranking, criteria 1 to 3 were reapplied exclusively to the mini-tournament matches between the teams in question to determine their final rankings. If this procedure did not lead to a decision, criteria 5 to 9 applied;
 Superior goal difference in all mini-tournament matches;
 Higher number of goals scored in all mini-tournament matches;
 If only two teams had the same number of points, and they were tied according to criteria 1 to 6 after having met in the last round of the mini-tournament, their rankings were determined by a penalty shoot-out (not used if more than two teams had the same number of points, or if their rankings were not relevant for qualification for the next stage).
 Lower disciplinary points total based only on yellow and red cards received in the mini-tournament matches (red card = 3 points, yellow card = 1 point, expulsion for two yellow cards in one match = 3 points);
 Drawing of lots.

To determine the ten best runners-up from the qualifying round and the best runner-up from the elite round, the results against the teams in fourth place were discarded. The following criteria were applied:
 Higher number of points;
 Superior goal difference;
 Higher number of goals scored;
 Lower disciplinary points total based only on yellow and red cards received (red card = 3 points, yellow card = 1 point, expulsion for two yellow cards in one match = 3 points);
 Drawing of lots.

Qualifying round

Draw
The draw for the qualifying round was held at UEFA headquarters in Nyon, Switzerland on 20 November 2013 at 10:45 CET (UTC+1).

The teams were seeded according to their coefficient ranking, calculated based on the following:
2011 UEFA Women's Under-19 Championship final tournament and qualifying competition (qualifying round and elite round)
2012 UEFA Women's Under-19 Championship final tournament and qualifying competition (qualifying round and elite round)
2013 UEFA Women's Under-19 Championship final tournament and qualifying competition (qualifying round and elite round)

Each group contained one team from Pot A, one team from Pot B, one team from Pot C, and one team from Pot D.

Notes
Israel (Coeff: 1.000) qualified automatically for the final tournament as hosts.
Andorra, Armenia, Gibraltar, Liechtenstein, Luxembourg, and San Marino did not enter.

Groups
All times were CEST (UTC+2).

Group 1

Group 2

Group 3

Group 4

Group 5

Group 6

Group 7

Group 8

Group 9

Group 10

Group 11

Ranking of second-placed teams
To determine the ten best second-placed teams from the qualifying round which advanced to the elite round, only the results of the second-placed teams against the first and third-placed teams in their group were taken into account.

Elite round

Draw
The draw for the elite round was held at UEFA headquarters in Nyon, Switzerland on 19 November 2014 at 11:30 CET (UTC+1).

The teams were seeded according to their results in the qualifying round. Germany, England and France, which received byes to the elite round, were automatically seeded into Pot A. Each group contained one team from Pot A, one team from Pot B, one team from Pot C, and one team from Pot D. Teams from the same qualifying round group could not be drawn in the same group.

Before the draw UEFA confirmed that, for political reasons, Ukraine and Russia could not be drawn in the same group due to the Russian military intervention in Ukraine.

Groups
All times were CEST (UTC+2).

Group 1

Group 2

Group 3

Group 4

In the 4 April game between England and Norway, the referee Marija Kurtes disallowed a penalty for England in the 90+6th minute (Norway were leading 2–1 at that time) due to encroachment, but instead of the penalty being retaken, which should have happened under the laws of the game, a free kick to Norway was awarded. England appealed the decision after the match and UEFA ruled that the match was to be replayed starting from the penalty kick. The match was replayed on 9 April 2015, 22:45 CEST (after the third round of matches was completed earlier in the day), with the same players who were on the field at the time of the penalty but under a different referee, Kateryna Zora (as the original referee had been sent home due to the error). England converted the penalty to tie the match at 2–2, and this remained the final score.

Group 5

Group 6

Ranking of second-placed teams
To determine the best second-placed team from the elite round which qualified for the final tournament, only the results of the second-placed teams against the first and third-placed teams in their group were taken into account.

Qualified teams
The following eight teams qualified for the final tournament.

1 Bold indicates champion for that year. Italic indicates host for that year.

Top goalscorers
The following players scored four goals or more in the qualifying competition.

14 goals
 Stina Blackstenius

9 goals
 Jill Roord

8 goals
 Andrea Sánchez

7 goals

 Mariona Caldentey
 Nahikari García

6 goals

 Valentina Bergamaschi
 Margarita Chernomyrdina
 Julia Glaser

5 goals

 Amber Maximus
 Tanya Arngrimsen
 Heidi Kollanen
 Marie-Charlotte Léger
 Laura Freigang
 Manuela Giugliano
 Sippie Folkertsma
 Maria Hiim
 Vanessa Malho
 Nataša Petrov

4 goals

 Katharina Aufhauser
 Leah Williamson
 Emma Heikkilä
 Lea Schüller
 Georgia Sakellari
 Moya Feehan
 Andreia Norton
 Anastasiya Berezina
 Elizabeth Arnot
 Pilar Garrote
 Ebru Topçu

References

External links

Qualification
2015
2014 in women's association football
2015 in women's association football
2015 in youth sport